Heydareh may refer to:
 Heydareh-ye Dar-e Emam
 Heydareh-ye Posht-e Shahr